In chess, a relative value (or point value) is a standard value conventionally assigned to each piece. Piece valuations have no role in the rules of chess but are useful as an aid to assessing a position.

The best known system assigns 1 point to a pawn, 3 points to a knight or bishop, 5 points to a rook and 9 points to a queen. Valuation systems provide only a rough guide. In specific positions, a bishop may be more valuable than a rook, for example.

Standard valuations 
The following table is the most common assignment of point values.

The oldest derivation of the standard values is due to the Modenese School (Ercole del Rio, Giambattista Lolli, and Domenico Lorenzo Ponziani) in the 18th century and is partially based on the earlier work of Pietro Carrera. The value of the king is undefined as it cannot be captured, let alone traded, during the course of the game. Chess engines usually assign the king an arbitrary large value such as 200 points or more to indicate that the inevitable loss of the king due to checkmate trumps all other considerations. The endgame is a different story, as there is less danger of checkmate, allowing the king to take a more active role. The king is good at attacking and defending nearby pieces and pawns. It is better at defending such pieces than the knight is, and it is better at attacking them than the bishop is. Overall, this makes it more powerful than a minor piece but less powerful than a rook, so its fighting value is worth about four points.

This system has some shortcomings. Combinations of pieces do not always equal the sum of their parts; for instance, two bishops are usually worth slightly more than a bishop plus a knight, and three  (nine points) are often slightly stronger than two rooks (ten points) or a queen (nine points). Chess-variant theorist Betza identified the 'leveling effect', which causes reduction of the value of stronger pieces in the presence of opponent weaker pieces, due to the latter interdicting access to part of the board for the former in order to prevent the value difference from evaporating by 1-for-1 trading. This explains why trading rooks in the presence of a queen-vs-3-minors imbalance favors the queen player, as the rooks hinder the queen, but not so much the minors.

The evaluation of the pieces depends on many parameters. Edward Lasker said, "It is difficult to compare the relative value of different pieces, as so much depends on the peculiarities of the position...". Nevertheless, he said that the bishop and knight are equal, the rook is worth a minor piece plus one or two pawns, and the queen is worth three minor pieces or two rooks. Larry Kaufman suggests the following values in the middlegame:

The  is worth a half a pawn more than the individual values of its constituent bishops combined. The position of the pieces also makes a significant difference, e.g. pawns near the edges are worth less than those near the centre, pawns close to promotion are worth far more, pieces controlling the centre are worth more than average, trapped pieces (such as ) are worth less, etc.

Alternative valuations
Although the 1-3-3-5-9 system of point totals is the most commonly given, many other systems of valuing pieces have been proposed. Several systems have the bishop as usually being slightly more powerful than a knight.

Note: Where a value for the king is given, this is used when considering piece development, its power in the endgame, etc.

Hans Berliner's system
World Correspondence Chess Champion Hans Berliner gives the following valuations, based on experience and computer experiments:

Bishops, rooks, and queens gain up to 10 percent more value in open positions and lose up to 20 percent in closed positions. Knights gain up to 50 percent in closed positions and lose up to 30 percent in the corners and edges of the board.

There are different types of doubled pawns; see the diagram. White's doubled pawns on the b-file are the best situation in the diagram, since advancing the pawns and exchanging can get them un-doubled and mobile. The doubled b-pawn is worth 0.75 points. If the black pawn on a6 were on c6, it would not be possible to dissolve the doubled pawn, and it would be worth only 0.5 points. The doubled pawn on f2 is worth about 0.5 points. The second white pawn on the h-file is worth only 0.33 points, and additional pawns on the file would be worth only 0.2 points.

Changing valuations in the endgame
As already noted when the standard values were first formulated, the relative strength of the pieces will change as a game progresses to the endgame. Pawns gain value as their path towards promotion becomes clear, and strategy begins to revolve around either defending or capturing them before they can promote. Knights lose value as their unique mobility becomes a detriment to crossing an empty board. Rooks and (to a lesser extent) bishops gain value as their lines of movement and attack are less obstructed. Queens slightly lose value as their high mobility becomes less proportionally useful when there are fewer pieces to attack and defend. Some examples follow.
 A queen versus two rooks
In the middlegame, they are equal
In the endgame, the two rooks are somewhat more powerful. With no other pieces on the board, two rooks are equal to a queen and a pawn
 A rook versus two minor pieces
 In the opening and middlegame, a rook and two pawns are weaker than two bishops; equal to or slightly weaker than a bishop and knight; and equal to two knights
 In the endgame, a rook and one pawn are equal to two knights; and equal to or slightly weaker than a bishop and knight. A rook and two pawns are equal to two bishops.
 Bishops are often more powerful than rooks in the opening. Rooks are usually more powerful than bishops in the middlegame, and rooks dominate the minor pieces in the endgame.
 As the tables in Berliner's system show, the values of pawns change dramatically in the endgame. In the opening and middlegame, pawns on the central files are more valuable. In the late middlegame and endgame the situation reverses, and pawns on the wings become more valuable due to their likelihood of becoming an outside passed pawn and threatening to promote. When there is about fourteen points of material on both sides, the value of pawns on any file is about equal. After that, wing pawns become more valuable.

C.J.S. Purdy gave  a value of  points in the opening and middlegame but 3 points in the endgame.

Shortcomings of piece valuation systems
There are shortcomings of giving each type of piece a single, static value.

Two minor pieces plus two pawns are sometimes as good as a queen. Two rooks are sometimes better than a queen and pawn.

In some open positions, a rook plus a pair of bishops are stronger than two rooks plus a knight.

Example 1

Positions in which a bishop and knight can be exchanged for a rook and pawn are fairly common (see diagram). In this position, White should not do that, e.g.:
 1. Nxf7 Rxf7
 2. Bxf7+ Kxf7
This seems like an even exchange (6 points for 6 points), but it is not, as two minor pieces are better than a rook and pawn in the middlegame.

In most openings, two minor pieces are better than a rook and pawn and are usually at least as good as a rook and two pawns until the position is greatly simplified (i.e. late middlegame or endgame). Minor pieces get into play earlier than rooks, and they coordinate better, especially when there are many pieces and pawns on the board. On the other hand, rooks are usually blocked by pawns until later in the game.

Example 2

In this position, White has exchanged a queen and a pawn (10 points) for three minor pieces (9 points). White is better because three minor pieces are usually better than a queen because of their greater mobility, and Black's extra pawn is not important enough to change the situation. Three minor pieces are almost as strong as two rooks.

Example 3

In this position, Black is ahead in material, but White is better. White's queenside is completely defended, and Black's additional queen has no target; additionally, White is much more active than Black and can gradually build up pressure on Black's weak kingside.

See also
 Chess endgame has material which justifies the common valuation system
 Compensation (chess)
 Evaluation function
  discusses the difference between a rook and a minor piece

References

Bibliography

External links 
 Relative Value of Chess Pieces
 Relative Value of Pieces and Principles of Play from The Modern Chess Instructor by Wilhelm Steinitz
 About the Values of Chess Pieces by Ralph Betza, 1996.
 The Evaluation of Material Imbalances by Larry Kaufman
“The Value of the Chess Pieces” by Edward Winter

Mathematical chess problems